Matthew Robert Blake (January 8, 1876 – November 21, 1937) was a Canadian politician and soldier.

Blake was born in Ashfield, Ontario, Canada. He was elected as a Member of the Unionist Party in the 1917 election. He was defeated in the 1921 election as a candidate for the historical Conservative Party then defeated again in 1925 and in 1930 in the riding of Winnipeg North. He was also a captain in the 106th Winnipeg Light Infantry Regiment as a medical officer.

External links
 

1876 births
1937 deaths
Canadian military doctors
Conservative Party of Canada (1867–1942) MPs
Members of the House of Commons of Canada from Manitoba
Unionist Party (Canada) MPs